The 58th Special Operations Wing (58 SOW) is a combat unit of the United States Air Force stationed at Kirtland Air Force Base, New Mexico. The 58 SOW is part of the Air Education and Training Command (AETC) Nineteenth Air Force.

The 58 SOW serves as the premier training site for Air Force special operations and combat search and rescue aircrews. The wing provides undergraduate, graduate and refresher aircrew training for special operations, rescue, missile site support and distinguished visitor airlift helicopter, fixed-wing, and tilt-rotor operations.  The wing employs more than 1,800 personnel and trains over 2,000 students a year.

Overview
The 58th Special Operations Wing's mission is to train mission-ready special operations, combat search and rescue, missile site support, and UH-1 Distinguished Visitor airlift crews directly supporting Air Expeditionary Forces for the United States Air Force.

The wing operates eight different weapon systems: UH-1N, HH-60G, HC-130J, MC-130J, and CV-22 totaling more than 60 assigned aircraft. The wing teaches more than 100 courses in 18 different crew positions including pilot, combat systems officer, flight engineer, communications system operator, loadmaster and special mission aviator. Additionally, the wing responds to worldwide contingencies and provides search and rescue support to the local community.

The unit also provides people and airlift needed in response to crises around the world and assists civilian authorities in regional rescues.   Supporting the 58th SOW training mission are approximately 1,250 military and civilian personnel administering over 90 training systems courses in 18 different crew positions.   Assigned units are:

 58th Operations Group (58 OG)
The 58th SOW's Operations Group is composed of five flying and two support squadrons, as well as three geographically separated pilot training units, one unit at Fort Rucker, Alabama, another unit at MCAS New River, North Carolina, and the third unit at Fairchild AFB, WA.
 23d Flying Training Squadron (23 FTS) (UH-1H & TH-1H) (Fort Rucker, AL)
 36th Rescue Squadron (36th RQS) (UH-1N) (Fairchild AFB, WA)
 58th Operations Support Squadron (58 OSS)
 58th Training Squadron (58 TRS)
 71st Special Operations Squadron (71 SOS) (CV-22)
 415th Special Operations Squadron (415th SOS) (HC-130J & MC-130J)
 512th Rescue Squadron (512 RQS) (UH-1N & HH-60G)

 58th Maintenance Group (58 MXG)
 58th Maintenance Squadron (58 MXS)
 58th Maintenance Operations Squadron (58 MOS)
 58th Aircraft Maintenance Squadron (58 AMXS)

History
 For additional history and lineage, see 58th Operations Group
Established as 58 Fighter-Bomber Wing on 25 June 1952. Activated on 10 July 1952 in Japan absorbing the personnel and equipment of the Texas Air National Guard 136th Fighter-Bomber Group.

Korean War
The 58 FBW moved to K-2 Air Base, later known as Taegu Air Base, South Korea, in August 1952. Fighter-bomber units like the 58 FBW provided close air support for United Nations ground forces. Often flying deep into North Korea's "MiG Alley," the 58 FBW targeted airfields, railways, enemy positions, bridges, dams, electric power plants and vehicles.

The 58th provided close air support for United Nations ground forces and attacked enemy airfields and installations.  In 1952 and early 1953 the wing flew interdiction and close air support missions in as well as attacking special strategic targets such as military schools, dams, and port facilities.  Having entered the war with slow, short-ranged F-84D Thunderjets, the 58 FBW transitioned in late 1952 to the new "G" model, designed with more speed and range. The wing attacked the major supply port of Sinuiju in September, inflicting heavy damage without loss of personnel or aircraft. Combining with other fighter-bomber units, it attacked the Kumgang Political School at Odong-ni, Kumgang County in October 1952 and the North Korean tank and infantry school at Kangso in February 1953. Truce talks between North Korea and the United Nations stalled in the spring of 1953. As a result, the Air Force began attacking previously excluded targets in the north. On 13 May 1953, Thunderjets from the 58 FBW struck the Toksan Dam, near Pyongyang causing a massive flood. Floodwaters from the breached dam destroyed ten bridges, ruined several square miles of rice crops, flooded over 1,000 buildings and rendered the Sunan Airfield inoperable. Three days later, the wing attacked the Chosan irrigation dam with similar results. The Far East Air Forces commander later credited the 58 FBW by stating the destruction of the Toksan and Chosan irrigation dams resulted in the enemy coming to the truce talks in earnest. On 27 July 1953 it attacked runway at Kanggye and, with the 49th Fighter-Bomber Wing, bombed Sunan Airfield for the final action of the war.  The wing earned a second DUC for its actions in the last three months of the war.

These missions were not easy and they came at a cost. By the end of December 1952, the war claimed 18 members of the 58 FBW. According to recent listings from the Defense Prisoner of War/Missing Personnel Office, the fates of 14 members assigned to the 58th FBW are still unaccounted.

The 58th FBW served in three Korean War campaigns and earned the Republic of Korea Presidential Unit Citation for its actions in combat.  After the armistice the 58th provided air defense for South Korea and deployed tactical components on rotational basis to Taiwan from January 1955 – February 1957.  From 15 March 1953 to 8 November 1954 the 58th service-tested a "reinforced" wing organization, exercising direct control of the tactical components of the attached wings.  In October 1958 it was re-armed with the TM-61C (Matador) tactical missile to provide a deterrent against attacks on South Korea, a mission that continued until 1962.

Fighter Training Wing

On 22 August 1969, the Air Force redesignated the wing as the 58th Tactical Fighter Training Wing and activated it under Tactical Air Command at Luke Air Force Base, Arizona, where it absorbed the personnel and equipment of the 4510th Combat Crew Training Wing. The wing conducted training of US, German Air Force, and other friendly foreign nation aircrew and support personnel, and participated in numerous operations and tactical exercises while operating Luke until April 1977.  It managed Tactical Air Command's Central Instructor School from 1971–1981.  Beginning in early 1983 it performed tactical fighter training for US and foreign aircrews in the General Dynamics F-16 Fighting Falcon.

The 58th deployed support personnel to Europe to augment United States Air Forces Europe units during the war against Iraq in 1991.

In the fall of 1991, its primary mission expanded to include tactical training in the F-15E Strike Eagle all-weather strike fighter.  By 1994, the wing had trained pilots and support personnel from the Netherlands, South Korea, Turkey, Pakistan, the Republic of Singapore, Norway, Greece, Egypt, Indonesia, and Venezuela.

Modern era
In April 1994, the wing's mission changed from the training of USAF and Allied fighter pilots to the training of USAF helicopter air crews and moved to Kirtland Air Force Base.  It also trained crews in special operations aircraft, including helicopters and modified C-130 Hercules aircraft.  It performed pararescue training and search and rescue missions as well.  Additionally, the wing trained for missile site support and airlift for distinguished visitors. At the same time the wing continued to deploy personnel worldwide for contingency and combat operations.

The wing airlifted a federal task force to Pennsylvania to investigate the crash site of the fourth airliner following the 11 September 2001 terrorist attacks.  Since that time the 58th has deployed personnel and equipment to support Operation Enduring Freedom and Operation Iraqi Freedom.

Today, the wing trains aircrews in the MC-130J Commando II and the CV-22 Osprey for the Air Force Special Operations Command; the HC-130J Combat King II and the HH-60G Pavehawk for the Air Combat Command (ACC), Pacific Air Forces (PACAF), and United States Air Forces in Europe (USAFE); the UH-1N Huey or Iroquois for Air Force Space Command; the TH-1H Huey or Iroquois for initial helicopter flight crew qualification; and those aircrew operationally gained to those commands from the Air Force Reserve Command and the Air National Guard.

Lineage
 Established as the 58th Fighter-Bomber Wing on 25 June 1952
 Activated on 10 July 1952
 Inactivated on 1 July 1958
 Redesignated 58th Tactical Fighter Training Wing on 22 August 1969
 Activated on 15 October 1969
 Redesignated 58th Tactical Training Wing on 1 April 1977
 Redesignated 58th Fighter Wing on 1 October 1991
 Redesignated 58th Special Operations Wing on 1 April 1994

Assignments
 Tactical Air Command, 10 July 1952 (attached to Fifth Air Force until 28 February 1955, Korean Air Division, Provisional, 314th, 1 – 14 March 1955, 314th Air Division, 15 March 1955 – 31 December 1956)
 Far East Air Forces, 1 January 1957
 314th Air Division, 1 January 1957 – 1 July 1958
 Twelfth Air Force, 15 October 1969
 Tactical Training, Luke, 1 April 1977
 832d Air Division, 1 December 1980
 Twelfth Air Force, 1 October 1991
 Nineteenth Air Force, 1 July 1993 – present

Components
Wings
 49th Fighter-Bomber Wing: attached 16 – 31 March 1953
 474th Fighter-Bomber Wing: attached 1 April 1953 – 8 November 1954

Groups
 49th Fighter-Bomber Group: attached 16 – 31 March 1953
 58th Fighter-Bomber Group (later 58th Operations Group): 10 July 1952 – 8 November 1957; 1 October 1991 – present
 474th Fighter-Bomber Group: attached 1 April 1953 – 24 November 1954

Squadrons
 23d Flying Training Squadron:  1 April 1994 – present
 69th Fighter-Bomber Squadron (later 69th Tactical Fighter Training Squadron): attached 1 March - 7 November 1957, assigned 8 November 1957 – 1 July 1958, 15 October 1969 – 16 March 1983
 71st Special Operations Squadron:  20 May 2005 – present
 310th Fighter-Bomber Squadron(later, 310th Tactical Fighter Training Squadron): attached 1 Mar - 7 November 1957, assigned 8 November 1957 – 1 July 1958; assigned 15 December 1969 – 1 October 1991.
 311th Fighter-Bomber Squadron (later 311th Tactical Fighter Training Squadron):  attached 1 Mar - 7 November 1957, assigned 8 November 1957 – 1 July 1958; assigned 18 January 1970 – 1 October 1991.
 312th Tactical Fighter Training Squadron: 1 October 1984 – 18 January 1991
 314th Tactical Fighter Training Squadron: 1 October 1986 – 1 October 1991
 333d Tactical Fighter Training Squadron: 22 March-31 July 1971
 415th Special Operations Squadron:  12 September 2011 – present
 418th Tactical Fighter Training Squadron: 15 October 1969 – 1 October 1976
 425th Tactical Fighter Training Squadron: 15 October 1969 – 22 August 1979
 426th Tactical Fighter Training Squadron: 18 January 1970 – 1 January 1981
 461st Tactical Fighter Training Squadron: 1 July 1977 – 29 August 1979
 512th Special Operations Squadron (later 512th Rescue Squadron):  25 March 1994 – present
 550th Special Operations Squadron:  1 April 1994 – 29 September 2016
 550th Tactical Fighter Training Squadron: 1 April 1970 – 29 August 1979
 555th Tactical Fighter Training Squadron: 5 July 5 – 29 August 1979
 4461st Tactical Fighter Training Squadron: 23 June 1976 – 1 July 1977
 4511th Combat Crew Training Squadron: 15 October 1969 – 18 January 1970
 4514th Combat Crew Training Squadron: 15 October – 15 December 1969
 4515th Combat Crew Training Squadron: 15 October 1969 – 18 January 1970
 4516th Combat Crew Training Squadron: 15 October 1969 – 18 January 1970

Stations
 Itazuke Air Base, Japan, 10 July 1952
 Taegu Air Base (K-9), South Korea, August 1952
 Osan-Ni (later Osan Air Base), South Korea, 15 March 1955 – 1 July 1958
 Luke Air Force Base, Arizona, 15 October 1969
 Kirtland Air Force Base, New Mexico, 1 April 1994 – present

Aircraft

 Republic F-84 Thunderjet, 1952–1954
 North American F-86 Sabre, 1954–1958
 North American F-100 Super Sabre, 1969–1971
 Lockheed F-104 Starfighter, 1969–1983
 Lockheed TF-104 Starfighter, 1969–1983
 Northrop F-5C Freedom Fighter, 1969–1979
 Northrop F-5E Tiger II, 1969–1979
 LTV A-7D Corsair II, 1969–1971
 McDonnell F-4 Phantom II, 1971–1982
 McDonnell Douglas F-15 Eagle, 1974–1979
 McDonnell Douglas TF-15 Eagle, 1974–1979
 General Dynamics F-16 Fighting Falcon, 1982–1991
 Bell UH-1H Huey, 1994–present
 Bell TH-1H Twin Huey, 1994–present
 Bell UH-1N Twin Huey, 1994–present
 Sikorsky HH-60 Pave Hawk, 1994–present
 Sikorsky MH-53J Pave Low, unknown–2007
 Bell Boeing CV-22 Osprey, 2005–present
 Lockheed HC-130P Combat King, 1994–present
 Lockheed MC-130P Combat Shadow, 1994–present
 Lockheed MC-130H Combat Talon II, 1994–present
 Lockheed HC-130J Combat King II, 2011–present
 Lockheed MC-130J Commando II, 2011–present

References
 Notes

Bibliography

External links
58 SOW Home Page

Military units and formations in New Mexico
0058